The Prescott City Jail is a historic city jail behind the city hall of Prescott, Arkansas.  The modest single-story structure was built for the city in 1912 by the Southern Structural Steel Company.  It is built of reinforced concrete, with metal grates covering unglazed window openings, and a doorway that is reinforced with heavy metal shutters.  It was built to replace an early jail, from which a suspect involved in the burglary of a prominent citizen's home had escaped, in part due to its poor condition.  This building, housing three cells, served the city until the 1960s.

The jail was listed on the National Register of Historic Places in 2005.

Gallery

See also
National Register of Historic Places listings in Nevada County, Arkansas

References

Jails on the National Register of Historic Places in Arkansas
Government buildings completed in 1912
1912 establishments in Arkansas
National Register of Historic Places in Nevada County, Arkansas
Individually listed contributing properties to historic districts on the National Register in Arkansas
Prescott, Arkansas